Norwegian pop-duo Marcus & Martinus has released three studio albums, one EP and 33 singles. Their debut studio album, Hei, was released in February 2015. It peaked at number 1 on the Norwegian Albums Chart. A special follow-up album, Hei – Fan-Spesial was released in November 2015 including additional tracks. Their second studio album, Together, was released in November 2016. It peaked at number 1 on the Norwegian Albums Chart and Swedish Albums Chart. Their third studio album, Moments, was released in November 2017. It peaked at number 1 on the Norwegian Albums Chart and Swedish Albums Chart.

Studio albums

Extended plays

Singles

Notes

References

Discographies of Norwegian artists